Sven Leonhardt (born 18 April 1968) is a German skier. He competed in the Nordic combined event at the 1992 Winter Olympics.

References

External links
 

1968 births
Living people
German male Nordic combined skiers
Olympic Nordic combined skiers of Germany
Nordic combined skiers at the 1992 Winter Olympics
Place of birth missing (living people)